Keegan House may refer to:

Keegan House (Natchitoches, Louisiana), listed on the National Register of Historic Places in Natchitoches Parish, Louisiana
Keegan House (Robeline, Louisiana), listed on the National Register of Historic Places in Natchitoches Parish, Louisiana